Two submarines of the French Navy have borne the name Archimède:

 , launched in 1909 and sold for scrap in 1921
 , a  launched in 1930 and decommissioned in 1952

French Navy ship names